The men's K-1 500 metres competition at the 2022 ICF Canoe Sprint World Championships in Dartmouth took place on Lake Banook.

Schedule
The schedule is as follows:

Results

Heats
The five fastest boats in each heat, plus the two fastest sixth-place boats advanced to the semifinals.

Heat 1

Heat 2

Heat 3

Heat 4

Heat 5

Semifinals
Qualification in each semi was as follows:

The fastest three boats advanced to the A final.The next three fastest boats advanced to the B final.The remaining boats advanced to the C final.

Semifinal 1

Semifinal 2

Semifinal 3

Finals

Final C
Competitors in this final raced for positions 19 to 26.

Final B
Competitors in this final raced for positions 10 to 18.

Final A
Competitors in this final raced for positions 1 to 9, with medals going to the top three.

References

ICF